Lize may refer to:

People

Given name
 Lize Broekx
 Lize Duyvis (1889-1964), Dutch painter
 Lize Feryn (born 1993), Belgian actress, model and author
 Lize Heerman, South African-born singer-songwriter
 Lize Kop (born 1998), Dutch football player
 Lize Marke (born 1936), Belgian singer
 Lize Spit (born 1988), Belgian writer
 Lize-Mari Retief (born 1986), South African swimmer
 Lizé Santana, American singer-songwriter, record producer and actress

Surname
 Sandra Lizé (born 1977), Canadian water polo player
 Yannick Keith Lizé (born 1974), Canadian water polo player

Places
 Lize Shangwuqu station, Beijing, China
 Lize Lu station, Suzhou, China

Other
 Battle of Lize